The 28th General Assembly of Prince Edward Island was in session from April 24, 1879, to April 15, 1882. The majority party was the Conservative Party led by William Wilfred Sullivan.

There were four sessions of the 28th General Assembly:

The speaker was John A. MacDonald.

Members

Notes:

External links 
  Election results for the Prince Edward Island Legislative Assembly, 1879-04-02
 Prince Edward Island, garden province of Canada, WH Crosskill (1904)

Terms of the General Assembly of Prince Edward Island
1879 establishments in Prince Edward Island
1882 disestablishments in Prince Edward Island